Step Up 2: The Streets (Original Motion Picture Soundtrack)  is the film soundtrack for the film Step Up 2: The Streets. It was released on February 5, 2008, by Atlantic Records.

The album debuted at number thirteen on the US Billboard 200, and peaked at number five two weeks later. It also reached number one on the US Top Soundtracks chart. The album appeared in various other charts worldwide, including in the top five of countries such as Switzerland, Austria, New Zealand, and Australia, where it peaked at number three on the ARIA Albums Chart, later receiving a Gold certification.

Step Up 2: The Streets featured the US Billboard Hot 100 number one hit single "Low," by rapper Flo Rida featuring hip-hop and R&B artist T-Pain, which helped the soundtrack's commercial performance. Rappers Missy Elliott and Plies both contributed with two tracks to the album. American R&B singers Cassie, Trey Songz, the group Cherish and Spanish singer Enrique Iglesias were also featured in the soundtrack.

Critical reception

Andy Kellman of AllMusic wrote that the soundtrack is "unsurprisingly, a mixed bag of pop-oriented rap and R&B featuring second-rate tracks from well-known stars, follow-ups from relative newcomers attempting to maintain and increase momentum, and a whole bunch of up-and-comers with early material," selecting Cassie's "Is It You", Cherish's "Killa" and KC's "Say Cheese" as highlights. Nathan S. from DJBooth.net commented "the best part of any decent soundtrack is listening to up-and-comers compete with the big boys, and some of Step Up'''s best songs come from some decidedly non-major artists," continuing, "it's not exactly a work of art, but it's not supposed to be, it's supposed to be entertaining. If you liked the movie you'll like the soundtrack." John Li of movieXclusive.com opined, "The head-bobbing tunes, the bouncy raps and the heavy rhythms are definitely not for those who like their music lyrical and sweet," noting the closest radio-friendly pop songs are "Is It You" and Trey Songz's "Can't Help But Wait" with the performers' "soulful vocals" heping to "soothe things down a bit."

While reviewing the film for ComingSoon.net, Brad Brevet stated the soundtrack "is filled with music far better than what most dance films have to offer." High-Def Digest reviewer Peter Bracke described "the pounding bass beats and intricate high-end, hip-hop intonations sound fantastic - I'm a fan of any track that hits from all angles and this kept me immersed in the film's key dance sequences." Adam Tyner of DVD Talk said the "Step Up 2: The Streets' soundtrack is all about the music, with hip-hop beats flooding every speaker and backed by a monstrous, room-rattling low-frequency kick." Bob Hoose from Plugged In selected the soundtrack as a negative element of the movie, "the hip-hop tunes in the soundtrack include repeated—though often hard to make out—references to "booty" and backsides." People'' picked it as "soundtrack of the week" on their issue dated March 3, 2008, adding that it "gives you plenty of reason to bust a move."

Track listing

Notes
 Other songs such as "Bounce," performed by Timbaland featuring Dr. Dre, Justin Timberlake and Missy Elliott, "The Diary of Jane," by Breaking Benjamin, "Money in the Bank," by Swizz Beatz,"Everything I Can't Have," by Robin Thicke, and "Midnight" by Pitbull ft. Casely among others, also appear in the movie, but weren't featured in the soundtrack album.

Credits and personnel
Credits adapted from AllMusic.

 Akon – primary artist
 Michael Barnett – composer
 Bayje – primary artist
 B.o.B – primary artist
 B.O.B.B.Y. IV – primary artist
 Brandon Bowles – composer
 Brit & Alex – primary artist
 Craig Brockman – instrumentation
 Cassie – primary artist
 Cherish – primary artist
 Desirée Craig-Ramos – soundtrack director
 Cupid – primary artist
 Buck Damon – music supervisor, soundtrack producer
 Denial – primary artist
 Missy Elliott – primary artist
 Mikkel Storleer Eriksen – composer
 Theron "Neff U" Feemster – composer, producer
 Flo Rida – primary artist
 Kaylin Frank – composer
 Enrique Iglesias – composer, primary artist
 Brad Jordan – composer
 Craig Kallman – soundtrack producer
 KC – primary artist
 Fallon King – composer
 Farrah King – composer
 Felisha King – composer
 Pat Kraus – mastering
 Glen Lajeski – composer, marketing, music creative
 Mitchell Leib – executive in charge of music,executive of soundtracks, soundtrack producer
 Ryan Leslie – producer
 Jay Lyriq – primary artist
 Tal Miller – mastering
 Steve Morales – composer, producer
 Melissa "Tortuga Wench" Muik – music editor
 Brent Paschke – producer
 Plies – composer, primary artist
 John Regan – design, layout design
 Rodney Richard – composer
 Makeba Riddick – composer
 Craig Rosen – A&R
 Scarface – primary artist
 Adam Shankman – executive soundtrack producer
 Sikora – primary artist
 Rich Skillz – producer
 Sophia Fresh – primary artist
 Tiffany Staton – art manager
 T-Pain – composer, primary artist
 Timbaland – producer
 Trey Songz – primary artist
 Montana Tucker – primary artist
 Teddy Verseti – primary artist
 Don Vito – producer
 Lambert Waldrip – composer
 Kevin Weaver – executive of soundtracks, soundtrack producer
 Young Joc – primary artist

Charts

Weekly charts

Year-end charts

Certifications

References

2008 soundtrack albums
Albums produced by Akon
Albums produced by Danja (record producer)
Albums produced by Nottz
Albums produced by Ryan Leslie
Albums produced by Stargate
Albums produced by Timbaland
Atlantic Records soundtracks
2000s film soundtrack albums
Hip hop soundtracks
Step Up (film series) albums